Lists of CBS television affiliates are available in the following formats:

 List of CBS television affiliates (by U.S. state)
 List of CBS television affiliates (table)